Osmer Beech Wheeler (February 14, 1809 Bethel, Fairfield County, Connecticut – August 11, 1906 Middletown, Orange County, New York) was an American politician from New York.

Life
He was the son of Jesse Wheeler, a lawyer. Osmer B. Wheeler became a tanner, and in 1830 removed to Greene County, New York where he worked as a foreman at Zadock Pratt's tannery. In 1833, he married Rebecca Jones, and they had six children. About 1838, he removed to Sullivan County, New York, established there his own tannery in a place which lies now in the Town of Forestburgh.

Wheeler was a Know Nothing member of the New York State Senate (9th D.) in 1858 and 1859.

Death 
Osmer died on August 11, 1906 Middletown, Orange County, New York. He was buried at the Hillside Cemetery in Middletown.

Sources
 The New York Civil List compiled by Franklin Benjamin Hough, Stephen C. Hutchins and Edgar Albert Werner (1867; pg. 442)
 Biographical Sketches of the State Officers and Members of the Legislature of the State of New York in 1859 by William D. Murray (pg. 106ff)
 Obituary Notes; OSMER B. WHEELER in NYT on August 12, 1906
 The Genealogical and Encyclopedical History of the Wheeler Family (pg. 105)

External links

1809 births
1906 deaths
New York (state) state senators
People from Bethel, Connecticut
People from Greene County, New York
People from Sullivan County, New York
New York (state) Know Nothings
19th-century American politicians
People from Middletown, Orange County, New York